Nikonov is a rural locality (a khutor) in Kapustinoyarsky Selsoviet of Akhtubinsky District, Astrakhan Oblast, Russia. The population was 3 as of 2010.

Geography 
It is located 39 km north-west from Akhtubinsk.

References 

Rural localities in Akhtubinsky District